Rossoshansky (masculine), Rossoshanskaya (feminine), or Rossoshanskoye (neuter) may refer to:
Rossoshansky District, a district of Voronezh Oblast, Russia
Rossoshansky (rural locality), a rural locality (a settlement) in Volgograd Oblast, Russia